Wallowa is a city in Wallowa County, Oregon, United States. The population was 808 at the 2010 census.

History 
The Wallowa Valley is within the traditional lands of the Nez Perce. In the late 19th century, the Wallowa band was one of more than a dozen groups who lived across the inland Northwest as members of the Nez Perce tribe. The U.S. government sent the army to force them out after they refused to sign a treaty that would have removed them from their land. Chief Joseph led tribal members more than 1,000 miles to western Montana. They repeatedly battled with the army as they fled.

Wallowa was platted in 1889. Wallowa is a Nez Perce word describing a triangular structure of stakes that in turn supported a network of sticks called lacallas to form a fish trap. The Nez Perce put these traps in the Wallowa River below the outlet of Wallowa Lake. The author of Oregon Geographic Names, Lewis A. McArthur, said that although the origin of this name is disputed, he puts great weight in Levi Ankeny who supplied this information as he was "thoroughly familiar with the early history and tradition of the Wallowa Valley" and "on intimate terms with many Indians who knew the facts of the matter".

Geography

Climate
This region experiences warm (but not hot) and dry summers, with no average monthly temperatures above . According to the Köppen Climate Classification system, Wallowa has a dry-summer humid continental climate, abbreviated "Dsb" on climate maps.

Demographics

2010 census
As of the census of 2010, there were 808 people, 352 households, and 222 families residing in the city. The racial makeup of the city was 95.9% White, 0.5% African American, 0.4% Native American, 0.4% from other races, and 2.8% from two or more races. Hispanic or Latino of any race were 2.0% of the population.

There were 352 households, of which 25.3% had children under the age of 18 living with them, 50.0% were married couples living together, 9.7% had a female householder with no husband present, 3.4% had a male householder with no wife present, and 36.9% were non-families. 31.8% of all households were made up of individuals, and 16.5% had someone living alone who was 65 years of age or older. The average household size was 2.24 and the average family size was 2.82.

The median age in the city was 48.2 years. 20.7% of residents were under the age of 18; 5.8% were between the ages of 18 and 24; 18.4% were from 25 to 44; 34.2% were from 45 to 64; and 21% were 65 years of age or older. The gender makeup of the city was 49.3% male and 50.7% female.

2000 census
As of the census of 2000, there were 869 people, 350 households, and 248 families residing in the city. The population density was 1,414.7 people per square mile (550.0/km). There were 396 housing units at an average density of 644.7 per square mile (250.6/km). The racial makeup of the city was 95.51% White, 0.12% African American, 0.46% Native American, 0.12% Asian, 1.73% from other races, and 2.07% from two or more races. Hispanic or Latino of any race were 2.99% of the population.

There were 350 households, out of which 34.6% had children under the age of 18 living with them, 56.9% were married couples living together, 10.9% had a female householder with no husband present, and 28.9% were non-families. 26.9% of all households were made up of individuals, and 14.9% had someone living alone who was 65 years of age or older. The average household size was 2.48 and the average family size was 3.00.

In the city, the population was spread out, with 29.8% under the age of 18, 4.3% from 18 to 24, 23.1% from 25 to 44, 23.9% from 45 to 64, and 18.9% who were 65 years of age or older. The median age was 41 years. For every 100 females, there were 101.6 males. For every 100 females age 18 and over, there were 92.4 males.

The median income for a household in the city was $28,603, and the median income for a family was $31,964. Males had a median income of $30,313 versus $15,417 for females. The per capita income for the city was $14,203. About 19.5% of families and 22.0% of the population were below the poverty line, including 33.1% of those under age 18 and 13.6% of those age 65 or over.

Annual cultural events
The Tamkaliks Celebration is a powwow named after the Nez Perce word for where you can see the mountains. It began in 1991 to welcome the Nez Perce back home to the Wallowa Valley.

Notable people
 Amos Marsh
 Frank Wayne Marsh
 Pearl Alice Marsh

Schools
These schools reside in Wallowa School District #12 which is located in Wallowa, OR, which is in the Wallowa Valley, which is located in Wallowa County, OR. "The district is home to about 195 students and 35 staff.  The elementary school and high school reside on the same campus. Their mission statement is "Through Student learning, Strategic Teaching, teamwork, and flexibility, all Wallowa School District students will become successful and positive contributors to society."

Wallowa Elementary School
Wallowa Elementary School educates grades preschool through six. They have approximately 100 students. 62% of their student population is economically disadvantaged. 11% of their student population have a disability. The school also has a student-run newspaper called the Cougar Club Chronicle; it is run by the fifth-grade class.

Wallowa Jr./Sr. High School
Wallowa High School currently educates grades seven through twelve. They have had a 100% graduation rate since 2012. The high school used to house all K-12 students, until their student population grew large enough to require the building of their elementary school. Their mascot is the cougar and their school colors are orange and black. Their choir program was restarted in 2015 and placed at state the same year. There is a FFA (Future Farmers of America) program that many students take part in.

References

External links

Entry for Wallowa in the Oregon Blue Book

Cities in Oregon
Cities in Wallowa County, Oregon
1889 establishments in Oregon
Populated places established in 1889